SportsCenter Philippines is the flagship newscast of One Sports, the sports division of TV5 Network. which was aired on TV5 from December 17, 2017 to July 21, 2020. It is the local version of SportsCenter following TV5's partnership with global sports network ESPN after a few years ESPN in the Philippines was hiatus for 5 years after being replaced by Fox Sports Asia (SportsCenter Asia has been relaunched as Fox Sports Central Asia since 2013).  It airs every Wednesday & Friday at 9:30 PM and Saturdays & Sundays at 9:00 PM.

History
Before the creation of SportsCenter Philippines, Sports5 had produced several editions of its own sports news show, mostly airs as a halftime show of its flagship broadcast property, the PBA.

AKTV Center
It was first known as AKTV Center, when TV5 airs its sports programs through AKTV block on IBC. It began airing on October 2, 2011, and serves as pre-game, halftime, and post-game show of the PBA games which began airing on AKTV on the same day. It was hosted by Patricia Bermudez-Hizon, with Mico Halili and Magoo Marjon as alternates. The format similar to Inside the NBA was adopted for the AKTV Center starting the 2011-12 Philippine Cup Quarterfinal round, usually having a three-man panel consisting of either Halili, Marjon, Bermudez-Hizon, Aaron Atayde and Dominic Uy. Special guests were added at the panel from time to time. Several characters were introduced for the segment, which also includes parodies of NBA players, namely "Kobesaya" (a look-alike of Kobe Bryant), "Jeremy Lin-ta" (Jeremy Lin) and "J.R. "Pepe" Smith" (J.R. Smith). AKTV Center airs from the IBC studios in Broadcast City but sometimes air from the playing venue during special occasions, notably the league's opening ceremonies and the jersey retirement of Robert Jaworski.

During the 2012 Commissioner's Cup, AKTV introduced "Home Court" with Lia Cruz as its host. The segment airs during the halftime break of the second game. However it only lasted for four episodes before returning to AKTV Center's original format.

AKTV Center ceased airing on May 31, 2013, along with AKTV block itself, following the expiration of blocktime agreement between TV5 and IBC by the end of the month. There were no formatted show aired during 2013 PBA Commissioner's Cup Finals when the PBA games was transferred to TV5 and AksyonTV.

Sports5 Center
During TV5's airing of the 2013 FIBA Asia Championship from August 1–11, 2013, a similarly formatted pre-game show was included in the broadcast, which was named Sports5 Center. This incarnation was carried over for the PBA's 2013-14 season, however it was only aired during Sundays. Sports5 Center was replaced by Sports 360 in November 2014.

In November 2016, the pre-game show was again renamed as Sports5 Center, retiring the Sports 360 pre-game show.

Sports5 Center continued to air after Sports5 was renamed as ESPN5 on October 13, 2017. It ended on the Game 7 of the 2017 PBA Governors' Cup Finals on October 27.

With the launch of SportsCenter Philippines, ESPN5 replaced Sports5 Center with PBA Halftime Show to fill-in on PBA halftime breaks.

Sports 360

Sports 360 is a sports-oriented show that also served as a pre-game program for the PBA games during the 2014-15 season. It was shown via livestreaming at Sports5.ph, before the start of the PBA's first game during weekdays and on TV5 before the start of the second game during weekends. The show focused on the latest news in the league as well as other sports. It spun off as a separate show starting February 1, 2015, though a short version of the show, Sports 360 Blitz was introduced for the 2015-16 season as pre-game and post-game show of the PBA. Sports 360 ceased airing by 2016.

Format
SportsCenter Philippines features the latest sports news and developments from the Philippines and around the world, with daily content contribution from SportsCenter of the U.S.

Covering the latest in sports news, highlights and updates in its signature fast-paced format, SportsCenter Philippines concentrates on the biggest stories of the day and the sports that matter most to Filipino fans, including the PBA, the NBA, American football, volleyball and more.

SportsCenter Philippines expands its coverage through its bulletin version SportsCenter Right Now (launched on November 24), airing during ESPN5 primetime programs, and a segment in News5's flagship newscast Aksyon Prime as SportsCenter sa Aksyon.

Final presenters

Final main anchors
 Aaron Atayde (2017–2020)
 Magoo Marjon (2017–2020)
 Amanda Fernandez (2017–2020)
 Lia Cruz (2017–2020) 
 Jinno Rufino (2018–2020)
 Cesca Litton-Kalaw (2019–2020)

Final substitute anchors and contributors
 Carla Lizardo (2018–2020)
 Selina Dagdag (2018–2020)
 Apple David (2018–2020)
 Mich Del Carmen (2018–2020)
 Eric Menk (2018–2020)
 Noel Zarate (2019–2020)

Reporters
 Chino Lui Pio
 Rizza Diaz
 Denise Tan
 Chuck Araneta
 Carla Lizardo
 Lyn Olavario (also a reporter for News5)
 Renz Ongkiko 
 Mark Zambrano

Former presenters & reporters
 Mara Aquino

References

2017 Philippine television series debuts
2020 Philippine television series endings
2020s Philippine television series
Philippine sports television series
TV5 (Philippine TV network) original programming
SportsCenter
Flagship evening news shows
Philippine television series based on American television series
Filipino-language television shows
English-language television shows